Willem Jacob van Stockum (20 November 1910 – 10 June 1944) was a Dutch mathematician who made an important contribution to the early development of general relativity.

Biography
Van Stockum was born in Hattem in the Netherlands.  His father was a mechanically talented officer in the Dutch Navy.  After the family (less the father) relocated to Ireland in the late 1920s, Willem studied mathematics at Trinity College, Dublin, where he earned a gold medal.  He went on to earn an M.A. from the University of Toronto and his Ph.D. from the University of Edinburgh.

In the mid-1930s, van Stockum became an early enthusiast of the then new theory of gravitation, general relativity.  In 1937, he published a paper which contains one of the first exact solutions in general relativity which modeled the gravitational field produced by a configuration of rotating matter, the van Stockum dust, which remains an important example noted for its unusual simplicity.  In this paper, van Stockum was apparently the first to notice the possibility of closed timelike curves, one of the strangest and most disconcerting phenomena in general relativity.

Van Stockum left for the United States in hope of studying under Albert Einstein, eventually in the spring of 1939 gaining a temporary position under Professor Oswald Veblen at the Institute for Advanced Study in Princeton.  The outbreak of the Second World War occurred while he was teaching at the University of Maryland. Anxious to join the fight against Hitler, he enlisted in the Royal Canadian Air Force, eventually earning his pilots wings in July 1942.  Because of his advanced knowledge of physics, he spent much of the next year as a test pilot in Canada. After the Netherlands was invaded by Hitler, van Stockum sought to join the war as a pilot. Finally, he was able to transfer to the Dutch Air Force (in exile), and in 1944 became the only Dutch officer posted to No. 10 Sq­ron of the RAF Bomber Command, which was stationed in Yorkshire and flew combat missions in the Halifax heavy bomber over Europe before and after the Normandy invasion. On 10 June 1944, van Stockum and his crew of six took off on their sixth combat mission, as part of another 400-plane raid.  Near their target, the plane was hit by flak, and all seven crew members were lost, along with seven from another bomber on the same mission. The fourteen airmen are buried in Laval, near the place where the planes went down.

References 
 Willem Jacob van Stockum: A scientist in uniform, De Vliegende Hollander (The Flying Dutchman), June 2004 (English translation by Carlo Beenakker). A newspaper article by an officer in the Dutch Air Force, on which this article is largely based.
 A soldier's creed, an essay written by van Stockum and published (under the byline "a bomber pilot", due to wartime security restrictions) in December 1944.
  The original paper presenting the rediscovery of Lanczos' 1924 dust solution, nowadays referred to as the Lanczos-van Stockum solution. 
 Time Bomber. Historical fiction by Robert P. Wack. Set in Normandy in June 1944. Willem is a central character.

Dutch relativity theorists
People from Hattem
1910 births
1944 deaths
Alumni of the University of Edinburgh
20th-century Dutch mathematicians
Royal Canadian Air Force personnel of World War II
Royal Air Force Volunteer Reserve personnel of World War II
Royal Air Force pilots of World War II
Royal Air Force personnel killed in World War II
Aviators killed by being shot down